Elmer J. McCurdy (January 1, 1880 – October 7, 1911) was an American bank and train robber who was killed in a shoot-out with police after robbing a Katy Train in Oklahoma in October 1911. Dubbed "The Bandit Who Wouldn't Give Up", his mummified body was first put on display at an Oklahoma funeral home and then became a fixture on the traveling carnival and sideshow circuit during the 1920s through the 1960s. After changing ownership several times, McCurdy's remains eventually wound up at The Pike amusement zone in Long Beach, California where they were discovered by a film crew of The Six Million Dollar Man and positively identified in December 1976.

In April 1977, Elmer McCurdy's body was buried at the Summit View Cemetery in Guthrie, Oklahoma.

Background
McCurdy was born in Washington, Maine on January 1, 1880. He was the son of 17-year-old Sadie McCurdy who was unmarried at the time of his birth. The identity of McCurdy's father is unknown; one possibility is Sadie's cousin, Charles Smith (McCurdy would later use the name "Charles Smith" as an alias). In order to save Sadie the embarrassment and shame of raising an illegitimate child, her brother George and his wife Helen adopted Elmer. After George died of tuberculosis in 1890, Sadie and Helen moved with Elmer to Bangor, Maine. Sadie eventually told her son that she, not Helen, was his mother and that she was unsure of who his biological father was. The news disturbed McCurdy who grew resentful and became "unruly and rebellious". As a teenager, he began drinking heavily, a habit he would continue throughout his life.

McCurdy eventually returned to Maine to live with his grandfather and became an apprentice plumber. He was a competent worker and lived comfortably until the economic downturn in 1898. McCurdy lost his job and, in August 1900, his mother died of a ruptured ulcer. His grandfather died of Bright's disease the following month. Shortly after his grandfather's death, McCurdy left Maine and began drifting around the eastern United States where he worked as a lead miner and plumber. He was unable to hold a job for an extended period due to his alcoholism. He eventually made his way to Kansas where he worked as a plumber in Cherryvale. McCurdy then moved to Iola, Kansas, where, in 1905, he was arrested for public intoxication. He then moved to Webb City, Missouri.

In 1907, McCurdy joined the United States Army. Assigned to Fort Leavenworth, McCurdy was a machine gun operator and was trained to use nitroglycerin for demolition purposes (the extent of this training was likely minimal). He was honorably discharged from the Quartermaster Corps on November 7, 1910. McCurdy then made his way to St. Joseph, Kansas where he met with an Army friend. On November 19, McCurdy and his friend were arrested for possessing burglary paraphernalia (chisels, hacksaws, funnels for nitroglycerin, gunpowder and money sacks). The St. Joseph Gazette reported that during their arraignment, McCurdy and his friend told the judge the tools were not intended for burglary purposes but were tools they needed to work on a foot-operated machine gun they were inventing. In January 1911, a jury found McCurdy not guilty. After his release from county jail, McCurdy's short lived career as a bank and train robber began. His robberies were generally bungled affairs due to McCurdy's ineptitude.

Crimes
McCurdy decided to incorporate his training with nitroglycerin into his robberies. This often caused problems as he was overzealous and failed to correctly determine the proper amount to use. By March 1911, McCurdy had again relocated to Lenapah, Oklahoma. On March 24, 1911, he and three other men decided to rob the Iron Mountain-Missouri Pacific train No 104 after McCurdy heard that one of the cars contained a safe with $4,000. They successfully stopped the train and located the safe. McCurdy then put nitroglycerin on the safe's door to open it but used too much. The safe was destroyed in the blast as was the majority of the money. McCurdy and his partners managed to net $450 in silver coins, most of which were melted and fused to the safe's frame.

On September 21, 1911, McCurdy and two other men attempted to rob The Citizens Bank in Chautauqua, Kansas. After spending two hours breaking through the bank wall with a hammer, McCurdy placed a nitroglycerin charge around the door of the bank's outer vault. The blast blew the vault door through the bank destroying the interior, but did not damage the safe inside the vault. McCurdy then tried to blow the safe door open with nitroglycerin but the charge failed to ignite. After the lookout man got scared and ran off, McCurdy and his accomplices stole about $150 in coins that were in a tray outside the safe and fled. Later that night, the men hopped a train which took them to the Kansas border. They split up and McCurdy made his way to the ranch of a friend, Charlie Revard, near Bartlesville, Oklahoma. He stayed in a hayshed on the property for the next few weeks and drank heavily.

Death
McCurdy's final robbery took place on October 4, 1911 near Okesa, Oklahoma. McCurdy and two accomplices planned to rob a Katy Train after hearing that it contained $400,000 in cash that was intended as royalty payment to the Osage Nation. However, McCurdy and the men mistakenly stopped a passenger train # 29 instead. The men were able to steal only $46 from the mail clerk, two demijohns of whiskey, a revolver, a coat and the train conductor's watch. A newspaper account of the robbery later called it "one of the smallest in the history of train robbery." McCurdy was disappointed by the haul and returned to Revard's ranch on October 6 where he began drinking the demijohns of whiskey he stole. By this time, he was also ill with tuberculosis which he developed after working in mines, and with a mild case of pneumonia, and with trichinosis. He stayed up drinking with some of the ranch hands before going to sleep in the hay loft the following morning. Unbeknownst to McCurdy, he had been implicated in the robbery and a $2,000 reward for his capture was issued.

In the early morning hours of October 7, a posse of three sheriffs, brothers Bob and Stringer Fenton and Dick Wallace, tracked McCurdy to the hay shed using bloodhounds. They surrounded the hay shed and waited for daylight. In an interview featured in the October 8, 1911 edition of the Daily Examiner, Sheriff Bob Fenton recalled:

It began just about 7 o'clock. We were standing around waiting for him to come out when the first shot was fired at me. It missed me and he then turned his attention to my brother, Stringer Fenton. He shot three times at Stringer and when my brother got under cover he turned his attention to Dick Wallace. He kept shooting at all of us for about an hour. We fired back every time we could. We do not know who killed him ... (on the trail) we found one of the jugs of whiskey which was taken from the train. It was about empty. He was pretty drunk when he rode up to the ranch last night.

McCurdy was killed by a single gunshot wound to the chest which he sustained while lying down.

Post-mortem commercialization

McCurdy's body was taken to the undertaker in Pawhuska, Oklahoma, where it went unclaimed. Joseph L. Johnson, the owner and undertaker, embalmed the body with an arsenic-based preservative typically used in embalming in that era to preserve a body for a long period when no next of kin were known. He then shaved the face, dressed the body in a suit and stored it in the back of the funeral home. As McCurdy lay unclaimed, Johnson refused to bury or release the body until he was paid for his services. Johnson then decided to exhibit McCurdy to make money. He dressed the corpse in street clothes, placed a rifle in the hands and stood it up in the corner of the funeral home. For a nickel, Johnson allowed visitors to see "The Bandit Who Wouldn't Give Up" (at various times, McCurdy was also called "The Mystery Man of Many Aliases", "The Oklahoma Outlaw", and "The Embalmed Bandit"). "The Bandit" became a popular attraction at the funeral home and drew the attention of carnival promoters. Johnson received numerous offers to sell McCurdy's corpse but refused.

On October 6, 1916, a man calling himself Aver contacted Joseph Johnson claiming to be Elmer McCurdy's long lost brother from California. Aver had already contacted the Osage County, Oklahoma sheriff and a local attorney to get permission to take custody of the body and ship it to San Francisco for proper burial. The following day, Aver arrived at the Johnson Funeral Home with another man calling himself Wayne, who also claimed to be McCurdy's brother. Johnson released the body to the men who then put it on a train, ostensibly to San Francisco. It was instead shipped to Arkansas City, Kansas. The men who claimed to be McCurdy's long lost brothers were in fact James and Charles Patterson. James Patterson was the owner of the Great Patterson Carnival Shows, a traveling carnival. After learning from his brother Charles about the popular "Embalmed Bandit" exhibit, the two concocted a scheme to take possession of the body in order to feature it in Patterson's carnival. McCurdy's corpse would be featured in Patterson's traveling carnival as "The Outlaw Who Would Never Be Captured Alive", until 1922 when Patterson sold his operation to Louis Sonney.

Louis Sonney used McCurdy's corpse in his traveling Museum of Crime, which featured wax replicas of famous outlaws such as Bill Doolin and Jesse James. In 1928, the corpse was part of the official sideshow that accompanied the Trans-American Footrace. In 1933, it was acquired for a time by director Dwain Esper to promote his exploitation film Narcotic!. The corpse was placed in the lobby of theaters as a "dead dope fiend" whom Esper claimed had killed himself while surrounded by police after he had robbed a drug store to support his habit. By the time Esper acquired McCurdy's body, it had become mummified; the skin had become hard and shriveled causing the body to shrink. Esper claimed that the skin's deterioration was proof of the supposed dope fiend's drug abuse.

After Louis Sonney died in 1949, the corpse was placed in storage in a Los Angeles warehouse. In 1964, Sonney's son Dan lent the corpse to filmmaker David F. Friedman. It eventually made a brief appearance in Friedman's 1967 film She Freak. In 1968, Dan Sonney sold the body along with other wax figures for $10,000 to Spoony Singh, the owner of the Hollywood Wax Museum. Singh had bought the figures for two Canadian men who exhibited them at a show at Mount Rushmore. While being exhibited there, the corpse sustained some damage in a windstorm; the tips of the ears, along with fingers and toes, were blown off. The men eventually returned the corpse back to Singh who decided that it looked "too gruesome" and not lifelike enough to exhibit. Singh then sold it to Ed Liersch, part owner of The Pike, an amusement zone in Long Beach, California. By 1976, McCurdy's corpse was hanging in the Laff in the Dark funhouse exhibition at The Pike.

Rediscovery and burial
On December 8, 1976, the production crew of the television show The Six Million Dollar Man was filming scenes for the "Carnival of Spies" episode in Long Beach, CA at The Pike. During the shoot, a prop man moved what was thought to be a wax mannequin that was hanging from a gallows. When the mannequin's arm broke off, a human bone and muscle tissue were visible.

Police were called and the mummified corpse was taken to the Los Angeles coroner's office. On December 9, Dr. Joseph Choi conducted an autopsy and determined that the body was that of a human male who had died of a gunshot wound to the chest. The body was completely petrified, covered in wax and had been covered with layers of phosphorus paint. It weighed approximately 50 pounds (23 kg) and was 63 inches (160 cm) in height. Some hair was still visible on the sides and back of the head while the ears, big toes and fingers were missing. The examination also revealed incisions from his original autopsy and embalming. Tests conducted on the tissue showed the presence of arsenic which was a component of embalming fluid until the late 1920s. Tests also revealed tuberculosis in the lungs which McCurdy had developed while working as a miner, bunions and scars that McCurdy was documented to have had. While the bullet that caused the fatal wound was presumably removed during the original autopsy, the bullet jacket was found. It was determined to be a gas check, which were first used in 1905 until 1940. These clues helped investigators pinpoint the era in which the man had been killed. Further clues to the man's identity were found when the mandible was removed for dental analysis. Inside the mouth was a 1924 penny and ticket stubs to the 140 W. Pike, Side Show and Louis Sonney's Museum of Crime. Investigators contacted Dan Sonney who confirmed that the body was Elmer McCurdy. Forensic anthropologist Dr. Clyde Snow was then called in to help make a positive identification. Dr. Snow took radiographs of the skull and placed them over a photo of McCurdy taken at the time of his death in a process called superimposition. Snow was able to determine that skull was that of Elmer McCurdy.

By December 11, the story of McCurdy's journey had been featured in newspapers and on television and radio. Several funeral homes called the coroner's office offering to bury McCurdy free of charge, but officials decided to wait to see if any living relatives would come forward to claim the body. Fred Olds, who represented the Indian Territory Posse of Oklahoma Westerns, eventually convinced Dr. Thomas Noguchi, then the Chief Medical Examiner-Coroner for the County of Los Angeles, to allow him to bury the body in Oklahoma. After further testing to ensure proper identification, Olds was allowed to take custody of the body.

On April 22, 1977, a funeral procession was conducted to transport McCurdy to the Boot Hill section of the Summit View Cemetery in Guthrie, Oklahoma. A graveside service attended by approximately 300 people was conducted after which McCurdy was buried next to another outlaw Bill Doolin. To ensure that McCurdy's body would not be stolen, two feet (60 cm) of concrete were poured over the casket.

See also
 Jeremy Bentham, whose mummified remains were put on display, in accordance with his will.
 Jonah Hex, a fictional, comic–book character whose post-demise exploits in The Last Jonah Hex Story echo McCurdy's posthumous fate.

References

Bibliography

External links
 Urban Legends Reference Page: Elmer McCurdy
 The Straight Dope: Was a dead body found inside an amusement park "mummy"?
 Grave of Elmer McCurdy the Sideshow Mummy
 Sideshow World: Elmer McCurdy
 

1880 births
1911 deaths
20th-century American criminals
People shot dead by law enforcement officers in the United States
Train robbers
American bank robbers
Burials in Oklahoma
Deaths by firearm in Oklahoma
Mummies
Outlaws of the American Old West
People from Knox County, Maine
Criminals from Oklahoma
Sideshow attractions
People from Cherryvale, Kansas
Criminals from Maine